Zodarion epirense is a spider species found in Bulgaria and Greece.

See also 
 List of Zodariidae species

References

External links 

epirense
Spiders of Europe
Spiders described in 1984